Dionisio Galparsoro Martínez (born 13 August 1978 in Ataun) is a Spanish racing cyclist formerly with UCI ProTeam .

Major results 

2004
 5th Overall Vuelta Ciclista a la Rioja
 5th Overall Vuelta a Castilla y León
2005
 1st Stage 4 Vuelta a Asturias
 Hessen Rundfahrt
1st Points Classification
1st Stage 3
 6th Clásica de Almería
 8th Gran Premio Miguel Indurain
2006
 6th Subida Urkiola
 6th Subida al Naranco
 10th Clásica de Almería
2007
 4th Overall Vuelta Ciclista a la Rioja
2008
 6th GP Llodio

External links

Spanish male cyclists
1978 births
Living people
People from Goierri
Sportspeople from Gipuzkoa
Cyclists from the Basque Country (autonomous community)